Dante Cappelli (6 January 1866 – 12 May 1948) was an Italian actor. He appeared in 71 films between 1909 and 1937.

He was born in Velletri, Italy and died in Rome.

Selected filmography

 Carmen (1909) - Escamillo
 Macbeth (1909, Short) - Macbeth
 Amleto (1910) - Hamlet
 Tigris (1913)
 Romanticismo (1913)
 Anima perversa (1913)
 Love Everlasting (1914) - Granduke of Wallenstein
 Pepeniello (Napoli 1820) (1914)
 Pagine sparse (1914)
 Lo scrigno dei milioni (1914)
 La contessa Fedra (1914)
 L'eterno romanzo (1914)
 L'abete fulminato (1914)
 Il vampiro (1914)
 Il diritto di uccidere (1914)
 Extra-dry: Carnevale 1910 - Carnevale 1913 (1914)
 Colei che tutto soffre (1914)
 Cofanetto dei milioni (1914)
 Circe moderna (1914)
 Un dramma tra le belve (1915)
 Sul campo dell'onore' (1915)
 La strega' (1915)
 La maschera folle' (1915)
 Beffa di Satana (1915)
 Amore che uccide (1916)
 ...e i rettili furono vinti! (1916)
 In mano del destino (1916)
 Il romanzo della morte (1916)
 Somiglianza funesta (1916)
 Buon Natale! (1916)
 L'uomo-Pappagallo (1917)
 Al di là della fede' (1917)
 Battaglia per l'amore' (1917)
 Come morì Butterfly (1917)
 Noblesse oblige (1918)
 Lagrime del popolo (1918)
 Il marito dell'amica (1919)
 La gibigianna (1919)
 Il medico delle pazze (1919)
 Dopo il perdono (1919)
 Centocelle (1919)
 L'amante della luna (1919)
 Cuor di ferro e cuor d'oro (1919)
 Cuori e caste (1919)
 La danza sull'abisso (1920)
 Non vendo mia figlia! (1920)
 Oro (1920)
 Biribì, il piccolo poliziotto torinese (1920)
 Supremo convegno (1920)
 I vagabondi dell'amore (1921)
 Il giro del mondo di un biricchino di Parigi (1921)
 Il delitto del commendatore (1921)
 Maddalena al deserto (1921)
 Tragedia di bambola (1922)
 Francesca da Rimini (1922)
 Lo strano viaggio di Pim-Popo (1922)
 La maschera che ride (1923)
 The Mysterious Mirror (1928) - Schloßkastellan
 Il treno delle 21,15 (1933)
 I due barbieri'' (1937) - (final film role)

External links

1866 births
1948 deaths
People from Velletri
Italian male film actors
Italian male silent film actors
20th-century Italian male actors